Viscount  was a Japanese general in the Imperial Japanese Army and a government minister during the Meiji period. He was instrumental in establishing the modern Imperial Japanese military.

Early life
Kodama was born on March 16, 1852, in Tokuyama, Tsuno, Suō Province, the first son of the samurai Kodama Hankurō. His father was a mid-ranking samurai with a 100 koku landholding. At the time, the Kodama family had two daughters, Hisako and then Nobuko, and since Kodama was the first male member of the family, his birth was greatly appreciated by the whole family. When Kodama was born, his father, Hankurō, was at the house of his friend Shimada Mitsune, a scholar of Chinese poetry, who lived across the street and was enjoying poetry with four or five other people. When a family member hurriedly arrived to announce the birth of a son, Hankurō was overjoyed and rushed straight home to raise a toast.

Military career
Kodama began his military career by fighting in the Boshin War for the Meiji Restoration against the forces of the Tokugawa shogunate in 1868. He was appointed a non-commissioned officer on 2 June 1870, advanced to sergeant major on 10 December, and promoted to warrant officer on 15 April 1871. He was commissioned a second lieutenant on 6 August and promoted to lieutenant on 21 September. He was promoted to captain on 25 July 1872 and to major on 19 October 1874.

As a soldier in the fledgling Imperial Japanese Army, he saw combat during the suppression of the Satsuma Rebellion. He later enrolled in the Osaka Heigakuryo (大阪兵学寮) Military Training School). Successive and rapid promotions followed: lieutenant-colonel on 30 April 1880, colonel on 6 February 1883, and major-general on 24 August 1889.

Kodama was appointed head of the Army Staff College, where he worked with German Major Jakob Meckel to reorganize the modern Japanese military after the Prussian military.

Kodama went on to study military science as a military attaché to Germany. After his return to Japan, he was appointed Vice-minister of War in 1892.

After his service in the Sino-Japanese War (1894–1895), Kodama became Governor-General of Taiwan. During his tenure, he did much to improve on the infrastructure of Taiwan and to alleviate the living conditions of the inhabitants. He was promoted to lieutenant general on 14 October 1896. Having proved himself an excellent administrator, Kodama spent the following decade serving as Minister of the Army under Prime Minister Itō Hirobumi. Kodama retained the post and took on the concurrent roles of Minister of Home Affairs and Education under the following prime minister, Katsura Tarō.

On 6 June 1904, Kodama was promoted to full general. However, he was asked by Marshal Ōyama Iwao to be Chief of General Staff of the Manchurian Army during the Russo-Japanese War. That was a  demotion for him in terms of rank, but he nevertheless chose to take the position; the sacrifice elicited much public applause. Throughout the Russo-Japanese War, he guided the strategy of the whole campaign, as General Kawakami Sōroku had done in the First Sino-Japanese War ten years earlier. The postwar historian Shiba Ryōtarō gives him complete credit for Japan's victory at the Siege of Port Arthur, but there is no historical evidence for that, and Kodama kept quiet about his role in the battle. After the war, he was named Chief of the Imperial Japanese Army General Staff but died soon afterwards.

Kodama was raised in rapid succession to the ranks of danshaku (baron) and shishaku (viscount) under the kazoku peerage system, and his death in 1906 of a cerebral hemorrhage was regarded as a national calamity.

Legacy

Following a petition by Kodama's son, Hideo, the Meiji Emperor elevated Hideo to the title of hakushaku (count). Kodama later received the ultimate honor of being raised to the ranks of Shinto kami. Shrines to his honor still exist at his hometown in Shūnan, Yamaguchi Prefecture, and on the site of his summer home on Enoshima, Fujisawa, Kanagawa Prefecture.

Honours
With information from the corresponding article in the Japanese Wikipedia

Peerages
Baron (20 August 1895)
Viscount (11 April 1906)

Order of precedence
Senior seventh rank (March 1874)
Senior sixth rank (28 May 1880)
Fifth rank (18 April 1883)
Fourth rank (27 September 1889)
Senior fourth rank (26 October 1894)
Third rank (8 March 1898)
Senior third rank (20 April 1901)
Second rank (23 April 1906)
Senior second rank (23 July 1906; posthumous)

Decorations

Japanese
Grand Cordon of the Order of the Sacred Treasure (27 December 1899; Second Class: 26 December 1894)
Grand Cordon of the Order of the Rising Sun (27 February 1902; 2nd Class: 20 August 1895; 3rd Class: 7 April 1885; 4th Class: 31 January 1878)
Grand Cordon of the Order of the Rising Sun with Paulownia Flowers (1 April 1906)
Grand Cordon of the Order of the Golden Kite (1 April 1906; 3rd Class: 20 August 1895)

Foreign
 : 1st Class of the Order of Saint Stanislaus (12 September 1892)
 : Commander of the Legion d'Honneur (14 October 1895)
 : 
 Knight 1st Class of the Order of the Red Eagle in Brilliants with swords (13 July 1906)
 : 1st Class of the Military Merit Order (12 September 1892)

On film
The actor Tetsurō Tamba portrayed Gentarō in the 1980 Japanese war drama film The Battle of Port Arthur (sometimes referred as 203 Kochi). Directed by Toshio Masuda the film depicted the Siege of Port Arthur during the Russo-Japanese War and starred Tamba as General Gentarō, Tatsuya Nakadai as General Nogi Maresuke and Toshirō Mifune as Emperor Meiji.

Notes

References

Mutsu, Gorō (1985). "Kodama Gentarō." Kodansha Encyclopedia of Japan. Tokyo: Kodansha Ltd.

External links 

 

|-

|-

1852 births
1906 deaths
Military personnel from Yamaguchi Prefecture
Japanese generals
Kazoku
Japanese military personnel of the First Sino-Japanese War
Japanese military personnel of the Russo-Japanese War
People of the Boshin War
People of Meiji-period Japan
Government ministers of Japan
Ministers of Home Affairs of Japan
Ministers of the Imperial Japanese Army
Governors-General of Taiwan
Mōri retainers
Recipients of the Order of the Golden Kite
Recipients of the Order of the Paulownia Flowers
Recipients of the Order of the Rising Sun
Recipients of the Order of the Sacred Treasure
Commandeurs of the Légion d'honneur